The list of shipwrecks in August 1873 includes ships sunk, foundered, grounded, or otherwise lost during August 1873.

1 August

2 August

3 August

4 August

5 August

6 August

7 August

8 August

9 August

10 August

11 August

12 August

13 August

14 August

15 August

16 August

17 August

18 August

19 August

20 August

21 August

23 August

24 August
A major hurricane struck Nova Scotia on this date, resulting in the loss of 1,122 vessels, 900 buildings and 600 lives.

25 August

26 August

27 August

28 August

29 August

30 August

31 August

Unknown date

References

Bibliography
 Ingram, C. W. N., and Wheatley, P. O., (1936) Shipwrecks: New Zealand disasters 1795–1936. Dunedin, NZ: Dunedin Book Publishing Association.

1873-08
Maritime incidents in August 1873